Investment AB Latour is the investment company controlled by the Swedish businessman and billionaire Gustaf Douglas and his family.

Through the company, Douglas controls inter alia, security firm Securitas AB and the world-leading lock producer Assa Abloy. Latour is also the biggest shareholder of the world's largest RVM provider Tomra (with 21.08% of the stock as of July 2021). 

Gustaf Douglas is the chairman of the company. His wife and one of his sons also serve on the company board.

References

External links
Official Website

Companies based in Gothenburg
Investment companies of Sweden
1984 establishments in Sweden
Financial services companies established in 1984
Companies listed on Nasdaq Stockholm